Geoffrey I of Vianden 7th duke of Vianden 1273-1310 (-1310) was a son to duke Filips I of Vianden and Mary of Brabant-Perwez.

He succeeded to his father in 1273 in Vianden. Geoffrey married Aleidis of Oudenaarde (1260-1305) and Lutgardis van Ligny and fathered:
 Filips II of Vianden 8th duke of Vianden 1310-1315/1316
 Lutgardis of Vianden, who married Jan van Sombreffe
 Margareth (1280-1336), who married duke Henry II of Lodi (-1366).

1273 births
1310 deaths